The churches of Philadelphia are numerous and diverse. Founded by William Penn to celebrate religious freedom, Philadelphia has many historic and significant churches, among many smaller and newer ones.

African Methodist Episcopal Church

Armenian Apostolic Church

Baptist

Brethren in Christ Church

Episcopal

Friends (Quaker)

Lutheran

Mennonite

Methodist

Non-Denominational

Orthodox Church

Albanian Orthodox

Greek Orthodox
Jurisdiction: Greek Orthodox Metropolis of New Jersey  (New Jersey; the Greater Philadelphia area; Delaware; Maryland; Virginia)

Orthodox Church in America (OCA)
Jurisdiction: Diocese of Eastern Pennsylvania

Russian Orthodox
Jurisdiction: Russian Orthodox Church in the USA

Pentecostal

Presbyterian

Roman Catholic

Ukrainian Catholic

Unitarian

See also

Buildings and architecture of Philadelphia
City of Conquerors Church, Philadelphia
Congregation Mikveh Israel
Partners for Sacred Places

External links
Churches in Philadelphia
Philadelphia Architects and Buildings

Philadelphia
Churches
Churches